8F or VIII-F may refer to :
 LMS Stanier Class 8F, a 1935 British 2-8-0 heavy freight steam locomotive
 A classification of steam locomotives by British Railways, denoting a locomotive rated for large freight duties
 Oflag VIII-F, a German prisoner of war camp
 Stalag VIII-F, a German prisoner of war camp
 Fischer Air IATA airline designator

See also
F8 (disambiguation)